Natalia Edzgveradze (born 23 July 1975) is a Georgian chess Woman Grandmaster and FIDE Trainer (2005), currently working in Georgia as Deputy Director of Maia Chiburdanidze Chess Academy.

External links

1975 births
Living people
Chess woman grandmasters
Female chess players from Georgia (country)
Chess coaches
21st-century women from Georgia (country)
Place of birth missing (living people)